Sex, Drugs and Rock n' LOL is the second album released by Sick Animation's Marc M. It was released on July 4, 2010.

Track listing

References

Hip hop albums by American artists
2010 albums